Dead Game Records is an American independent record label in founded in Baton Rouge, Louisiana, by Tommy Jones and Travis Johnson. The label started in 2002 when Jones noticed an opening and lapse in marketing by other local and regional labels. The label has included Kevin Gates and Max Minelli.

History
Johnson was a classmate of Kevin Gates at Kenilworth Middle School in Baton Rouge. Johnson encouraged him to take rapping and his skills more seriously. In 2005 Gates signed to Dead Game Records as the labels main artist for over half a decade. With  financial support and strategic marketing Gates flourished. Releasing six mixtapes, including features with Boosie Bad Azz, who was from the same neighborhood as Johnson and Jones.

In the absence of Gates for two years, Dead Game joined former Koch Entertainment artist Max Minelli to release The Heart of a King and The Leak. In 2011, after his release from incarceration, Gates resumed his career with a new inspired style and an intense effort to release a multitude of projects in a short period of time. This was noticed by Artist Publishing Group which entered a joint venture partnership with Dead Game allowing Gates to be distributed by Atlantic Records.

Roster 
 Kevin Gates
 Baby Joe
 The Voice
 BeezyKKK
 Adam Dollars

Former
 Racked up Ready (Deceased)
 Kevin Gates
 Max Minelli

Mixtapes

Albums

See also
List of record labels

References

External links
Dead Game Records Official Youtube
Dead Game Records Official Website

Hip hop record labels
American independent record labels
Record labels established in 2002
Gangsta rap record labels
Music production companies
Music publishing companies of the United States
Pop record labels
Companies based in Baton Rouge, Louisiana